Kuldip Kaur, (1927–3 February 1960), was an Indian actress who worked in Hindi and Punjabi films. Known for her roles as negative characters, she was cited as one of Indian cinema's "most polished vamps" and actor Pran's "opposite number".  She started her acting career with the first Punjabi film produced in India following Partition; Chaman, also called The Garden in 1948.

Acclaimed as a "vamp" of "exceptional talent" and the "first female villain" in Indian cinema, she has been compared to artists like Shashikala and Bindu. Active from 1948 to 1960, she acted in over 100 films, most of them in Hindi and some in Punjabi. She died in 1960 from tetanus.

Personal life
Kuldip Kaur was born into a Guron Jat family in 1927 in Lahore, Punjab, British India. Her family were Ladhran royal family in Attari, Amritsar District, in Punjab. She was married to Attariwala royal member Mohinder Singh Sidhu, a grandson of the military Commander of Ranjit Singh's army, General Sham Singh Attariwala. Married at the age of fourteen, she became a mother at the age of sixteen.

Kaur defied convention to join films while still in Lahore. She left Lahore in 1947 while communal violence was raging. She was described as a brave lady by Saadat Hasan Manto in his chapter on Kuldip Kaur, titled "Kuldip Kaur: The Punjabi firecracker" in his book Stars from Another Sky:  The Bombay Film World of the 1940s. Kaur returned to Lahore in spite of the violence, to pick up Pran's car. His car had been left behind when Pran and she left for Bombay to escape the communal rioting in Lahore following partition of India. She drove the car back alone from Lahore to Bombay, via Delhi.

Career
The German cinematographer, Josef Wirsching of Bombay Talkies, took her screen test at the request of Savak Vacha, one of Bombay Talkies' then-proprietors, along with Ashok Kumar and S. Mukherji. On his recommendation she was cast in supporting roles.

One of Kuldip Kaur's first films was the Punjabi language Chaman in 1948, which turned out to be a big success at the box office, co-starring Karan Dewan with Meena Shorey. Kuldip Kaur also acted in two Hindi films that year; Ziddi directed by Shaheed Latif and starring Dev Anand, Kamini Kaushal and Pran, and Grahasti both of which were "box office hits". In Grahasti she performed the role of a "modern, sophisticated woman intolerant of her husband".

In 1949, Kuldip Kaur acted a musical success, Ek Thi Ladki,  with music by Vinod. Her next film was Kaneez, in 1949, an average film commercially. In 1950, she was in two successful Hindi films; Samadhi and Aadhi Raat and two Punjabi films; Madari and Chhai. In Samadhi, the popular song "Gore Gore Banke Chhore" was picturised on her and Nalini Jaywant. In 1951, she acted in several films such as Rajput, Nai Zindagi, Ek Nazar, Afsana and Mukhda, where she played the lead role. Afsana was directed by B. R. Chopra and starred Ashok Kumar and Veena. Kaur was stated to have played her role of a vamp "to perfection".

She also then appeared in films such as Baiju Bawra (1952) in which her acting was critically acclaimed as the dacoit queen, Roopmati. Some of the other films she acted in 1952 to 54 were Anjaam (1952), Baaz (1953), Anarkali (1953) where her acting was praised, Aabshar (1953), Gul Bahar and Dak Babu in (1954). 1955 was a busy year for her, acting in films such as Teer Andaz (1955) and Miss Coca Cola (1955). With few releases in 1956, she returned with Ek Saal (1957), acting opposite Madhubala and Ashok Kumar. In 1958, Kuldip Kaur had roles in two films; Sahara and Panchayat. In 1959, she worked in three films Pyaar Ka Rishta, Mohar and Jagir. Mohar had music composed by Madan Mohan and became another musical success for her. Maa Baap, Bade Ghar Ki Bahu, Sunheri Raatein and the Punjabi film Yamla Jatt in 1960 were the last films she acted in. Her last film was Honeymoon (1960), also one in which she played the vamp.

Some of the important films Kuldip Kaur acted in were Ek Thi Ladki, Samadhi (1950), Aadhi Raat (1950), Chhoti Bhabhi (1950), Anarkali (1953), Afsana (1951) and Baiju Bawra.

Death
Kaur died on 3 February 1960, in Bombay, Maharashtra, of tetanus, following thorn pricks from a Ber tree (jujube) on a visit to Shirdi, Ahmednagar District, which she did not consider serious enough to require treatment.

Filmography
Kuldip Kaur was active between 1948-1960.

References

External links 
 

1927 births
1960 deaths
20th-century Indian actresses
Actresses from Punjab, India
Actresses in Hindi cinema
Deaths from tetanus
People from Lahore
Indian film actresses
Indian Sikhs